Khwaja Wasiuddin (1920–1992) was an army general and diplomat. He started his career as a young officer in the British Indian Army and later became a senior general in Pakistan Army. He was the permanent representative of Bangladesh to the United Nations.

Early life
Khwaja Wasiuddin was born on 20 March 1920 in Ahsan Manzil, Dacca, Bengal Presidency (Present-day Bangladesh). His father Khwaja Shahabuddin was the governor of North-west Frontier Province of Pakistan and member of the Dhaka Nawab family; his father's elder brother was Sir Khawaja Nazimuddin, the second Governor-General of Pakistan and subsequently its second Prime Minister. His mother was Farhat Banu, the niece of sir salimullah and member of the Bengal Legislative Assembly. He studied at Dhaka Muslim High School and later in St Gregory's High School. In 1938 he graduated from Prince of Wales Royal Military College.

Career
After graduation, he joined the Indian Military Academy and was commissioned as a Second Lieutenant in April 1940 in the 8th Punjab Regiment of the British Indian Army. He served in the Burma Campaign of World War II. He reached the rank of major by 1943. In 1945 he was promoted to rank of lieutenant colonel and appointed as the additional deputy president of Inter Services Selection Board of British Indian Armed Forces.

Pakistan
After the partition of India he opted for Pakistan Army. In Pakistan, he continued to work in Pakistani Inter Services Selection Board, eventually becoming its president. In 1951 he went for further studies in Camberley Staff College in United Kingdom and subsequently was promoted to the rank of brigadier general. In 1960 he was made the general officer commanding (GOC) of the 14th Division located in East Pakistan's Dhaka and in 1963 he was the commander of 10th Division located in Lahore, West Pakistan. In 1962 he was a provincial martial law administrator. In 1964 he got his higher educations from Imperial Defense College in United Kingdom. In 1967, he was promoted to the rank of Lieutenant General and was appointed as the commander of the II Corps, the headquarters was firstly in Lahore and later was transferred to Multan, Punjab.

Bangladesh
During the Bangladesh Liberation War he was the Master General of Ordnance (MGO) in General Headquarters in Rawalpindi, West Pakistan. In October 1973, he was repatriated to Bangladesh from Pakistan. After returning to Bangladesh he would serve as the ambassador of Bangladesh to Kuwait and France. He retired from Bangladesh Army in 1973 and was made the permanent representative of Bangladesh to the United Nations, position he held until 1986. As the representative he supported Indonesia's annexation of East Timor in the United Nation.

Death
He died on 22 September 1992 in Dhaka, Bangladesh.

References

People from Dhaka
Bangladeshi diplomats
1920 births
1992 deaths
Pakistani generals
Members of the Dhaka Nawab family
Ambassadors of Bangladesh to France
Ambassadors of Bangladesh to Kuwait
Permanent Representatives of Bangladesh to the United Nations
Pakistani military personnel
British Indian Army personnel
Rashtriya Indian Military College alumni